Glyphodes eurygania is a moth in the family Crambidae. It was described by Herbert Druce in 1902. It is found in Papua New Guinea, among other places.

References

Moths described in 1902
Glyphodes